The Dadaocheng Wharf is a wharf in Dadaocheng, Datong, Taipei, Taiwan.

History

Located near the No. 5 Water Gate on the banks of the Tamsui River, Dadaocheng Wharf thrived in earlier years as an entrepot for trade along the river. Tea, cotton and silk textiles were among the main products bought and sold here, attracting trading companies from across the western world. During the Japanese rule of Taiwan, the activities around the area declined. In 2005, the Taipei City Government revived the area as a tourism destination, bicycling spot, and departure point for boat tours along the Tamsui River.

Architecture
The area surrounding the wharf is equipped with bicycle paths along the Tamsui River.

Destinations
Boats departing from the wharf head to Tamsui District in New Taipei during the weekends.

Transportation
The wharf is accessible within walking distance north of Beimen Station of Taipei Metro.

Opening Times
The wharf has boat departures daily on weekends.  There is also a weekday service available for groups with an advance appointment, and for 10 or more individual passengers.

See also
 Transportation in Taiwan
 Tourism in Taiwan

References

Transportation in Taipei
Wharves in Taiwan